Alur are a Nilotic ethnic group who live in northwestern Uganda and northeastern Democratic Republic of the Congo (DRC). They are part of the larger Luo group.

In Uganda, they live mainly in the Nebbi, Zombo, Pakwach and Arua districts, while in the DRC, they reside mostly north of Lake Albert.

Language
Most members of the group speak Alur, a language closely related to Dojunam Acholi, Adhola, and Luo languages.  Some Alur speak Lendu or Kebu.
Alur language dialects vary considerably. The highland Alur (Okoro) speak a slightly different dialect from the lowland Alur (Jonam), and it might be difficult to for a native highland Alur person to properly understand his lowland kinsman.

Chiefdoms
The Alur Kingdom is probably the only one that was unaffected by the Ugandan ban on traditional monarchies in 1966. All Alur Kings are referred to as "Rwoth", just like all Luo Chiefs and Kings. The current Alur King is Rwoth Phillip Rauni Olarker, whose coronation was in 2010.

When the Europeans arrived, the Alur people were organized in ten chiefdoms, namely: Angal, Juganda, Jukoth, Mukambu, War Palara, Panduru, Ukuru, Paidha, Padeo and Panyikano. Based on the royal spear head bearing tradition, the Ubimu of Alur tribe H.M Philip Olarker Rauni III is the supreme ruler of the entire Alur tribe, with his capital at Kaal Atyak Winam, Zombo district, Uganda.

In Angal, the current king is Rwoth Djalore Serge II. He took over from his late father Kamanda who died in 1998. All these sub tribes of the Alur descended directly from King Nyipir lineage.

History, politics and tribe life
The largest Alur tribe was the Ukuru clan, who counted 10,000 adult men in 1914, although Alur counted boys as young as 14 years as men.

The Ukuru tribe was founded in 1630 when Ngira, a member of the Aryak family migrated with a number of young men including his younger brother Ijira. They took over the territory from the indigenous Bantu inhabitants. The region was quickly alurized.

The descendants of the original Bantu men now form the Abira family. Bantu maternal ancestry is very common in Ukuru. The Ukuru tribes grew in competition with other tribes. Some other clans were completely taken over providing the Ukuru clan with more food resources, women and men to defend their territory.

Other clans were dominated from afar. In 1789 the Ukuru clan defeated the Panduru clan to become the most powerful Alur clan. For years the Ukuru clan was the most powerful, populous and largest Alur clan.

Meanwhile, in the Ukuru clan, the Atyak family was losing his importance. For generations the Atyak family provided the Rwoth, Chief. Alur society is strictly hierarchical. Men have a higher social standing; then women and the men themselves also have a strict hierarchy.

Social rank depended on a lot of things – assertiveness, number of friends and family (allies), performance on male prestige tasks (war, patrols, hunting and fishing). Rank is in theory not inheritable. But a man who had a high-ranking father had, as a rule, more brothers, cousins, and family and was better able to attract allies. But overall every man could reach a high status with the right mix of qualities.

Every Alur men from 16 years old could vote which man was to become the chief. Only a man who is already high-ranking could become a chief.

The Alur have a tendency to choose young men as chiefs but if he is a good chief he remains chief for life. Alur clans are in fact a number of patrilineages living together. Most clans have around five patrilineages but the Ukuru clan has 11 patrilineages.

These patrilineages can include large numbers of men, all descendants of the same man. The Parombo family (patrilineage) in the Ukuru clan, for example, included 2000 men in 1949. These patrilineages are not strictly fictional. The Alur are very serious about it and maintain a family tree. Of course, a certain level of flexibility has occurred but overall we can trust the picture the Alur paint of their patrilineages. By 1820 the other patrilineages worked together to prevent an Atyak man from becoming Rwoth. This decline in Atyak power resulted in the rapid growth of other patrilineages like the Parombo, Palei and The Aryek. In particular the Aryek family became politically important.

High rank confers many advantages in Alur society. Expecting respect and admiration, high-ranking men had first choice in food, especially prestige food like meat and beer. High-ranking men typically had a large number of cattle and since the Alur paid the bride price in cattle high-ranking men had the most wives and thus children. The chief typically had the most children of any man in the clan. High-ranking men had three or more wives, average men two and low-ranking men typically one. As always there was flexibility since low-ranking men could be very successful in tending cattle and thus in acquiring wives but then their rank typically rose.

Men always stayed in the clan they were born in but women married men from other clans and moved there. Very few women married men from their own clan since the Alur had very strict rules about incest avoidance. Every man in your patrilineage was un-marriageable no matter how long ago the common ancestor was. Since Alur fathers typically arranged marriages for their daughters outside their own clan only a specific request from a man from her own clan could keep an Alur woman in her own clan.

Day-to-day life
Traditionally, the Alur live in grass-thatched huts. The homesteads in Alur clans are in the central part of their territory. This helps keeps the territory under their control. The Alur were farmer-herders. The Alur grew (and grow) millet, cassava, maize, sweet potatoes, spinach, and pumpkins. They herded cattle, goats, and chickens. Goat and chicken were important sources of meat. Other important resources were salt, forest and wild animals all who were protected from other clans. In the drought season fishing was important. The large herds of animals the Alur typically hunt as secondary sources of meat so as not to exhaust their own goat and chicken numbers moved away to greener pastures.

In Alur society men did most of the work. They herded the domestic animals, grew the crops, built the huts, hunted, fished and dominated political life. The women were responsible for keeping house, rearing the children and cooking. Although at first glance it looks like the men have more work but in fact the men have more pasture than women. Many of the men jobs are bound to strict times (they hunted in large groups just once a month for example). The sexes are segregated by the Alur. Husband and wife have their own hut. The men sleep alone and the women and children together. They also eat separately.

Women and men rarely mix socially. This behavior is not enforced by the men but it is in the woman's best interest to minimize contact with men out of fear of aggression and the husband's jealousy. Alur men are very close and social with men from their own clan. They hunt, farm, fish, go to war, herd, patrols form coalitions against rivals together. Since Alur men stay in the clan they are born in and women move to the clan of their husband the men are typically more social, have more friends and a wider social network than women. This is a very important factor in male dominance by the Alur. All men of a particular patrilineage can use land to plant crops to feed their families.

Famous Alur people

 Chief Amula (1871–1942)
Amula was born in the Aryek patrilineage as the son of Alworuna and Acoamfa. The fortunes of the Aryek family had been rising before Amula's birth. The first known Aryek patriarch, Abok Ucweda had been an insignificant man in the politics of the Ukuru clan. The same couldn't be said for some of his sons. Ugena had been chief for five years (1845–1850) before being deposed with help from his half-brother Nziri, Amula's paternal grandfather. Amula's father Alworuna had been known to be the best warrior of the Ukuru clan. Three brothers of Alworuna, Amatho, Kubi and Avur also managed to become powerful, respected men. Four Amula brothers, including his full brother Aryem, also became powerful. Amula grew up in  the 1878 Ukuru-Panduru war which the Ukuru clan lost and in which around 600 Ukuru men died in a few days of intense fighting. Amula's father Alworuna was burned alive by Panduru forces led by their chief, Ujuru. Amula's uncle Amatho died trying to avenge his brother's death. Amula grew up to be a powerful man who rapidly rose in the social hierarchy from the age of 15. In 1890, at 19 years old, he was elected as the chief of the Ukuru clan. He immediately began a war with the Panduru clan and managed to avenge his father's death. Afterward, he consolidated his hold on the Ukuru clan by entering into allegiances with other powerful patrilineages mainly with the Palei, Parombo and sections of the Patek patrilineage. He also could count on the support of many individual men. Amula proved to be a good chief, strong willed but compassionate. He was skillful in wars partly because of his ability to secure alliances with other clans. He was the voice of reason when the British arrived in 1914, compelling the clan not to fight them. He was exiled by the British in 1917 for not rigidly following their orders but was allowed back in 1922. He died in 1942, still very popular and loved by the clan. As a chief, Amula had many wives and children. His son Jalusiga (1896–1978) succeeded him as chief although this was a British doing and not a choice of the clan. Another son of his, Jalaure (born in 1888), acted as chief in his absence from 1917–1922.

References

 
Ethnic groups in the Democratic Republic of the Congo
Ethnic groups in Uganda